The Chiktong T'an'gwang Line, or Chiktong Colliery Line, is an electrified standard-gauge secondary line of the Korean State Railway in South P'yŏngan Province, North Korea, running from Taegŏn Station at the junction of the Taegŏn and Ŭnsan lines to Chiktong T'an'gwang. The line serves the Pusan Aluminium Factory at Pusalli, as well as the large 8 February Chiktong Ch'ŏngnyŏn Colliery at Chiktong T'an'gwang.

Route
A yellow background in the "Distance" box indicates that section of the line is not electrified.

References

Railway lines in North Korea
Standard gauge railways in North Korea